The chalcogens react with each other to form interchalcogen compounds.

Although no chalcogen is extremely electropositive, nor quite as electronegative as the halogen fluorine (the most electronegative element), there is a large difference in electronegativity between the top (oxygen = 3.44 — the second most electronegative element after fluorine) and bottom (polonium = 2.0) of the group. Combined with the fact that there is a significant trend towards increasing metallic behaviour while descending the group (oxygen is a gaseous nonmetal, while polonium is a silvery post-transition metal), this causes the interchalcogens to display many different kinds of bonding: covalent, ionic, metallic, and semimetallic.

Known binary interchalcogens

Bonding in the binary interchalcogens
Going down the above table, there is a transition from covalent bonding (with discrete molecules) to ionic bonding; going across the table, there is a transition from ionic bonding to metallic bonding. (Covalent bonding occurs when both elements have similar high electronegativities; ionic bonding occurs when the two elements have very different electronegativities, one low and the other high; metallic bonding occurs when both elements have similar low electronegativities.) For example, in the leftmost column of the table (with bonds to oxygen), O2 and O3 are purely covalent, SO2 and SO3 are polar molecules, SeO2 forms chained polymers (stretching in one dimension), TeO2 forms layered polymers (stretching in two dimensions), and PoO2 is ionic with the fluorite structure (spatial polymers, stretching in three dimensions); in the bottom row of the table (with bonds to polonium), PoO2 and PoS are ionic, PoxSey and PoxTey are semimetallic, and Po∞ is metallic.

Summary of known binary interchalcogens

Sulfur chalcogenides

Lower sulfur oxides, SxOy where the ratio X:Y is greater than 1:2
Disulfur monoxide, S2O
Disulfur dioxide, S2O2
Sulfur monoxide, SO
Sulfur dioxide, SO2
Sulfur trioxide, SO3
Higher sulfur oxides, SOx where x>3

Selenium chalcogenides

Selenium dioxide, SeO2
Selenium trioxide, SeO3
Many "alloys" of selenium and sulfur in different concentrations with semimetallic bonding, SexSy
"Selenium monosulfide", SeS
"Selenium disulfide", SeS2, actually a 2:1 mixture of cyclo-Se3S5 and cyclo-Se2S6
"Selenium trisulfide", SeS3, actually occurring as the cyclic dimer Se2S6

Tellurium chalcogenides

Tellurium monoxide, TeO (unstable transient species)
Tellurium dioxide, TeO2
Tellurium trioxide, TeO3
Ditellurium pentoxide, Te2O5
Many "alloys" of tellurium and sulfur in different concentrations with semimetallic bonding, TexSy
Many "alloys" of tellurium and selenium in different concentrations with semimetallic bonding, TexSey

Polonium chalcogenides

Polonium monoxide, PoO
Polonium dioxide, PoO2
Polonium trioxide, PoO3
Polonium monosulfide, PoS
Many "alloys" of polonium and selenium in different concentrations with semimetallic bonding, PoxSey
Many "alloys" of polonium and tellurium in different concentrations with semimetallic bonding, PoxTey

See also
Interhalogen
Hydrogen chalcogenide

Notes

References

Chalcogens